PowerAnimator and Animator, also referred to simply as "Alias", the precursor to what is now Maya and StudioTools, is a highly integrated industrial 3D modeling, animation, and visual effects suite. It had a relatively long track record, starting with Technological Threat in 1988 and ending in Pokémon: The Movie 2000 in 1999. PowerAnimator ran natively on MIPS-based SGI IRIX and IBM AIX systems.

History 
PowerAnimator was launched in 1988.

In 1997, John Gibson, Rob Krieger, Milan Novacek, Glen Ozymok, and Dave Springer were presented with the Scientific and Engineering Award for their contributions to the geometric modeling component of the PowerAnimator system. The citation was:
"The Alias PowerAnimator system is widely regarded in the computer animation field as one of the best commercially available software packages for digital geometric modeling. Used by many motion picture visual effects houses, it has been a benchmark for comparison of modeling tools and has had a major influence on visual effects and animation."

Television and film

PowerAnimator was used to create the water creature in the 1989 film The Abyss, as well as the T-1000 character in Terminator 2: Judgment Day, at a cost of $460,000 per minute. It was also used heavily for the many visual effects of the 1996 film Independence Day. PowerAnimator also served as the solution used to produce South Park episodes digitally before production was moved to Maya starting with Season 5.

Game development 
PowerAnimator was also used in game development, in particular as a part of Nintendo 64's SGI-based developers kit. It saw some use for modeling, texturing, animation and realtime effects for other titles and platforms as well.

Notable titles:
 Crash Bandicoot
 Casper
 Wing Commander 3
 Wing Commander 4
 Quake I
 Oddworld: Abe's Oddysee

References

Notes

External links 
 Animation Software Companies and Individuals In CGI

1988 software
Animation software
3D graphics software
IRIX software